The 2019 WTA Awards are a series of awards given by the Women's Tennis Association to players who have achieved something remarkable during the 2019 WTA Tour.

The awards
These awards are decided by either the media, the players, the association, or the fans. Nominees were announced by the WTA's Twitter account and on the WTA official website.

Note: award winners in bold

Player of the Year
 Ashleigh Barty
 Karolína Plíšková
 Naomi Osaka
 Simona Halep
 Bianca Andreescu

Doubles Team of the Year
 Elise Mertens &  Aryna Sabalenka
 Hsieh Su-wei &  Barbora Strýcová
 Timea Babos &  Kristina Mladenovic
 Samantha Stosur &  Peng Shuai

Most Improved Player of the Year
 Belinda Bencic
 Sofia Kenin
 Alison Riske
 Donna Vekić
 Amanda Anisimova
 Zheng Saisai

Newcomer of the Year
 Bianca Andreescu
 Coco Gauff
 Dayana Yastremska
 Karolína Muchová
 Elena Rybakina
 Iga Świątek

Comeback Player of the Year
 Belinda Bencic
 Svetlana Kuznetsova
 Bethanie Mattek-Sands

Karen Krantzcke Sportsmanship Award
 Petra Kvitová

Peachy Kellmeyer Player Service Award
 Gabriela Dabrowski

Diamond Aces
 Kiki Bertens

WTA Coach of the Year
 Craig Tyzzer (worked with  Ashleigh Barty)
 Torben Beltz  (worked with  Donna Vekić)
 Sylvain Bruneau (worked with  Bianca Andreescu)

Fan Favourite Player
 Johanna Konta
 Iga Świątek
 Sloane Stephens
 Markéta Vondroušová
 Maria Sharapova
 Elina Svitolina
 Petra Kvitová
 Amanda Anisimova
 Donna Vekić
 Ashleigh Barty
 Hsieh Su-wei
 Belinda Bencic
 Simona Halep
 Maria Sakkari
 Venus Williams
 Dayana Yastremska
 Serena Williams
 Sofia Kenin
 Bianca Andreescu
 Kiki Bertens
 Karolína Plíšková
 Karolína Muchová
 Naomi Osaka
 Petra Martic
 Alison Riske
 Aryna Sabalenka
 Madison Keys
 Elise Mertens
 Angelique Kerber

Fan Favorite WTA Shot of the Year
 Simona Halep, second round of Dubai Championships (31%)
 Iga Świątek, semifinals of Lugano Open (40%)()
 Patricia Maria Țig, semifinals of Bucharest Open (5%)
 Elina Svitolina, round robin of WTA Finals (24%)

Fan Favorite WTA Match of the Year
 Naomi Osaka vs  Bianca Andreescu, China Open quarterfinals (5–7, 6–3, 6–4)()

Fan Favorite Grand Slam Match of the Year
 Naomi Osaka vs  Petra Kvitová, Australian Open final (7–6, 5–7, 6–4)()

The awards and honours of the decade (2010s)
In December 2019 WTA announced five top 10 categories of different aspects which marked 2010s in WTA tennis.

Top 10 Rivalries of the Decade
  Serena Williams vs  Venus Williams, 18–12 (four times at Majors in 2010s, including 2017 Australian Open final)
  Maria Sharapova vs  Simona Halep, 7–2 (most matches went to third set, includes Sharapova's three set victory in 2014 French Open final)
  Angelique Kerber vs  Karolína Plíšková, 7–5 (five matches in finals, including Kerber's three set victory in 2016 US Open final) 
  Serena Williams vs  Maria Sharapova, 20–2 (Serena won 19 matches since Maria was leading the head to head 2–1 in 2004)
  Petra Kvitová vs  Agnieszka Radwańska, 8–5 (including Radwanska's three set victory in final at 2015 WTA Finals)
  Victoria Azarenka vs  Li Na, 6–5 (including Azarenka's three set victory in 2013 Australian Open final)
  Belinda Bencic vs  Naomi Osaka, 3–0 (Bencic ended Osaka's title defence at 2019 Indian Wells and 2019 US Open)
  Maria Sharapova vs  Li Na, 10–5 (played 9 times in 2010s, 2 Major semifinal matches)
  Simona Halep vs  Elina Svitolina, 5–5 (most of the matches being played in the final stages of the biggest tournaments)
  Serena Williams vs  Karolína Plíšková, 2–2 (three of the four matches happened at Majors)

Top 10 Streaks of the Decade
  Serena Williams, winning second "Serena Slam", 2014–15 non-calendar year Grand Slam
 2019 season, 18 different tournaments, 18 different champions at the start of the year
  Victoria Azarenka, 26-match win streak, ascent to world No. 1 and first Major at Australian Open to start the 2012 season
  Martina Hingis &  Sania Mirza, 41-match winning streak in doubles during 2015–16
  Bianca Andreescu, 8–0 vs top 10 in 2019
  Caroline Wozniacki, 2010 season 32–4 record after Wimbledon, including 4 titles and becoming world No. 1
  Belinda Bencic, 4–0 vs world No. 1s
  Serena Williams, 20-match win streak in Miami from 2013–16 which included 3 titles
  Johanna Konta, 2015 season translate from ITF tour to having success at US Open and Wuhan
  Aryna Sabalenka, having a perfect record at Premier 5 tournament in Wuhan, which includes two titles in a row (2018–2019)

Top 10 Comebacks of the Decade
  Serena Williams, comeback after maternity leave, reaching four Major finals, the first coming just 10 months after giving birth
  Petra Kvitová, comeback in just six months from stabbing, to win Birmingham just two weeks back
  Bethanie Mattek-Sands, comeback from injury to win US Open in mixed doubles, a year after dislocating her knee cap
  Martina Hingis, comeback from retirement in 2013 to play doubles, winning eventually four Majors and having 41-match winning streak during 2015–16
  Ashleigh Barty, return to tennis in early 2016 after playing cricket during two-year-hiatus from tennis, going on to win her first Major and finishing 2019 as the world No. 1
  Venus Williams, comeback after Sjögrens Syndrome diagnosis in 2011, winning Olympic gold less than year later, and reaching two Major finals in 2017
  Justine Henin, comeback from retirement after 18 months in 2010, reaching immediately finals of Sydney and Australian Open
  Belinda Bencic, comeback from injury to reach again top 10 in 2019 after three years and winning Dubai and Moscow
  Elena Vesnina, comeback from injury to win Olympic gold in doubles and Indian Wells in singles
  Victoria Azarenka, comeback after maternity leave, climbing from No. 978 to the top 50 in 2017

Top 10 Upsets of the Decade
  Roberta Vinci vs  Serena Williams, semifinals of 2015 US Open (2–6, 6–4, 6–4), Vinci playing first Slam semifinal and being outside top 40, ended Serena's Calendar Slam hunt
  Monica Puig vs  Angelique Kerber, final of the 2016 Olympics (6–4, 4–6, 6–1), Puig winning the gold unseeded and beating three Grand Slam champions and two current top 3 players
  Jeļena Ostapenko vs  Simona Halep, final of 2017 French Open (4–6, 6–4, 6–3), Ostapenko winning first Slam and also title of any kind at 20 years old, being ranked No. 47
  Dominika Cibulková vs  Angelique Kerber, final of 2016 WTA Finals (6–3, 6–4), Cibulkova winning the tournament after first going 0–2 in round robin and avenging loss to Kerber in that stage 
  Bianca Andreescu vs  Angelique Kerber, final of 2019 Indian Wells (6–4, 3–6, 6–4), Andreescu becoming first wild card champion in Indian Wells at 18 years old
  Li Na vs  Caroline Wozniacki, semifinals of 2011 Australian Open (3–6, 7–5, 6–3), Li saving match point to become first Chinese Major finalist and later that year a champion
  Victoria Azarenka vs  Maria Sharapova, final of 2012 Australian Open (6–3, 6–0), Azarenka winning 12 of the last 13 games in her first Major final
  Flavia Pennetta vs  Li Na, semifinals of 2014 Indian Wells (7–6, 6–3), Pennetta going on to win the title in less than a year after comeback from injury
  Hsieh Su-wei vs  Agnieszka Radwańska, third round of 2018 Australian Open (6–2, 7–5), with Hsieh being ranked at No. 88
  Ashleigh Barty vs  Petra Kvitová, quarterfinals of 2019 Miami Open (7–6, 3–6, 6–2), Barty winning first match of rivalry after previously being down 4–0

Top 10 WTA Outfits of the Decade
  Maria Sharapova, 2017 US Open
  Maria Sharapova, 2017 US Open (second outfit)
  Naomi Osaka, 2019 US Open
  Serena Williams, 2015 Australian Open
  Caroline Wozniacki, 2010 US Open
  Sorana Cirstea, 2019 French Open
  Andrea Petkovic, 2018 Australian Open
  Venus Williams, 2017 Australian Open
  Ana Ivanovic, 2016 US Open
  Kristina Mladenovic, 2017 Wimbledon

References

WTA Awards
WTA Awards